The Journal of Transatlantic Studies (JTS) is a multi-disciplinary, peer-reviewed academic journal that covers all aspects pertaining to transatlantic relations.

The Journal of Transatlantic Studies is the official publication of the Transatlantic Studies Association (TSA) and is the only scholarly journal dedicated to the study of transatlantic relations. It approaches this subject from an explicitly multi-disciplinary perspective and covers the following range of subjects:
 Political science
 Comparative constitutionalism
 International relations
 Security studies
 History
 Literature and culture
 Geography and population studies
 Planning and environment
The Journal of Transatlantic Studies not only seeks to study Euro-American relations, but also issues relating to interactions between Europe and Latin America.

Prof. Alan P. Dobson (University of Swansea) is currently the editor. The Journal of Transatlantic Studies is published quarterly by Taylor and Francis.

External links
Information about the journal
Transatlantic Studies Association

International relations journals
Political science journals
Security